Classic Cinemas is the largest Illinois based movie theatre chain.  Headquartered in Downers Grove, Illinois, it operates 16 locations with 137 screens in Illinois and Wisconsin (as of May 2022) under Tivoli Enterprises  ownership. Its first theatre and company namesake is the restored Tivoli, which has over 1000 seats in the original auditorium, in Downers Grove, Illinois.  A second auditorium, with 33 seats, was completed in 2021.

Notable features

Classic Cinemas is known for its extensive and historically sensitive renovations of historic theatres some of which include painstaking recreations of plasterwork, glass, and marquees. Classic Cinemas founders Willis and Shirley Johnson are members of a number of preservation societies and were awarded the Landmarks Illinois Richard H. Driehaus Foundation Preservation Award for “Stewardship” in 2011.

During a period in the 1980s when some major films were released with 70mm prints for select theatres, Classic Cinemas (then under the Tivoli Enterprises name) featured these wide-gauge prints at their flagship Tivoli Theatre for bargain prices once they had ended their first-run engagements. This might be the only example of a "sub run" theatre showing films in that format.

Classic Cinemas finished its technology overhaul in 2012 installing Christie CP4230 projectors, GDC SX2000AR servers, and Datasat AP-20 audio processors. Now all screens have 4K, High Frame Rate (HFR), personal captioning devices, descriptive narration, and hearing impaired systems.  They are also installing micro-perforated screens for the ultimate picture quality.  All theatres and auditoriums are equipped 7.1 sound. The chain has started to install dts:X object-based sound at several locations

Classic Cinemas has installed luxury power recliners in all of Beloit, Cinema 12, Charlestowne, Fox Lake, La Grange, North Riverside Luxury 6, Cinema 7, Paramount, Meadowview and York auditoriums.  They also have added recliners to some of the Elk Grove, Kendall 11, Lindo, Tivoli, and Woodstock screens.

Classic Cinemas, based in Downers Grove, Illinois, is a family-owned company operated by Willis, Shirley and Chris Johnson. Established in 1978, Classic Cinemas operates 16 theatres with 137 screens in 15 communities in the northern Illinois and Wisconsin area. As of September 23, 2016, Classic Cinemas opened up Cinema 7 in Sandwich, Illinois.

Locations
 Beloit Theater in Beloit, Wisconsin, 10 screens
 Charlestowne 18 in St. Charles, Illinois, 18 screens
 Cinema 12 in Carpentersville, Illinois, 12 screens
 Cinema 7 in Sandwich, Illinois, 7 screens
 Elk Grove Theatre in Elk Grove Village, Illinois, 10 screens
 Fox Lake Theatre in Fox Lake, Illinois, 9 screens
 Kendall 11 in Oswego, Illinois, 11 screens
 La Grange Theatre in La Grange, Illinois, 6 screens
 Lake Theatre in Oak Park, Illinois, 7 screens
 Lindo Theatre in Freeport, Illinois, 9 screens
 Meadowview Theatre in Kankakee, Illinois, 7 screens  
 North Riverside Luxury 6 in North Riverside, Illinois, 6 screens
 Paramount Theatre in Kankakee, Illinois, 5 screens
 Tivoli Theater in Downers Grove, Illinois, 2 screens
 Woodstock Theatre in Woodstock, Illinois, 8 screens 
 York Theatre in Elmhurst, Illinois, 10 screens

Former locations
 Arcada Theater, and Foxfield Theater (closed 2001) in St. Charles, Illinois
 Casino Cinema at Grand Victoria Casino Elgin (closed 2002) in Elgin, Illinois
 Sterling Theater in Sterling, Illinois
 Tivoli South, (closed 2001) in Downers Grove, Illinois,
 Barrington Square Theaters (closed October 2000) in Hoffman Estates, Illinois
 Spring Hill Mall Theaters (closed April 17, 1998) in West Dundee, Illinois
 Ogden 6 (closed June 7, 2020) in Naperville, Illinois, 6 screens
 Park Forest Theater (closed now known as Holiday Star Theater) in Park Forest, Illinois
 Tradewinds Cinemas 1 & 2 (closed 2002) in Hanover Park, Illinois
 Hinsdale Theater (closed 2012) in Hinsdale, Illinois

References

Landmarks Illinois. "Award for Stewardship"

External links
 Classic Cinemas
 Theatre Historical Society of America

Cinemas and movie theaters in Illinois
Movie theatre chains in the United States
Companies based in DuPage County, Illinois
Downers Grove, Illinois